The following are international rankings of

Economy

 The Wall Street Journal and the Heritage Foundation: Index of Economic Freedom 2006 , ranked 49 out of 157 countries
International Monetary Fund: GDP (nominal) per capita (2000), ranked 71 out of 182 countries
International Monetary Fund: GDP (nominal) (2006), ranked 92 out of 181 countries
 United Nations: Human Development Index 2006, ranked 58 out of 177 countries

Education

Literacy rate 94 percent

Environment

Yale University: Environmental Sustainability Index 2005, ranked 28 out of 146 countries

Globalization 

 A.T. Kearney/Foreign Policy Magazine: Globalization Index 2006, ranked 21 out of 62 countries

Politics

 Transparency International: Corruption Perceptions Index 2006 ranked 84 out of 163 countries
Reporters Without Borders: Worldwide press freedom index 2006, ranked 39 out of 168 countries

Historical data

(1) Worldwide ranking among countries evaluated.
(2) Ranking among the 20 Latin American countries (Puerto Rico is not included).
(3) Because the  Gini coefficient used for the ranking corresponds to different years depending on the country, and the underlying household surveys differ in method and in the type of data collected, the distribution data are not strictly comparable across countries. The ranking therefore is only a proxy for reference purposes, and though the source is the same, the sample is smaller than for the HDI

References

Panama